The 2014 Gooik–Geraardsbergen–Gooik is a one-day women's cycle race held in Belgium starting and finishing in Gooik on 1 June 2014. The race had a UCI rating of 1.1.

Results

See also
 2014 in women's road cycling

References

Gooik-Geraardsbergen-Gooik
Gooik-Geraardsbergen-Gooik
Gooik-Geraardsbergen-Gooik